Imtu Ratish (born 26 February 1987) is a Bangladeshi model, anchor and actor. He has  appeared in several television commercials, short film, drama and anchoring. He has been appeared in some film also. Such as: Joiboti Koinnar Mon, Abar Basanta and Partner.

Early life
He was born on 26 February 1987 in Chittagong, Bangladesh.  He is the son of Md. Wahid Ullah and Suhani. He studied at Chittagong Port Authority High School.

Career
Imtu Ratish began his career with modeling in 2006 by Amitabh Reza. He performed as host in Ekushey TV's special show  'Iftar Hat'. He worked regularly on various types of advertising and music videos. He was the host of Bangladeshi Idol. He appeared in Ekushey Television's film related show Cine Hits as a regular anchor. He appeared in Ekushey Television's Film related show Cine Hits as an regular anchor. Also he appeared in ATN Bangla TV's show Chayer Chumuke. He received state level invitation from Malaysia and Nepal government as a guest media person to host a show. He is the only person from the media personality of Bangladesh who has been invited there. In the year of 2016, he made his big screen debut in the film Joiboti Koinnar Mon directed by Nargis Akhtar, which was a government funded film. He appeared in his second film Abar Basanta directed by Ananya Mamun in 2019. He acted also in Netflix web series Ting Tang. In addition, he has performed numerous television drama and some web series.

References

Living people
1987 births
Bangladeshi male film actors
Bangladeshi male models
People from Chittagong District